The 1987 British Caledonian Tokyo Masters was a professional non-ranking snooker tournament that took place between 28 and 31 August 1987 at the Tokyo Prince Hotel in Tokyo, Japan. This was the first and so far only professional snooker tournament to be held in Japan.

Dennis Taylor won the tournament by defeating Terry Griffiths 6–3 in the final.

Main draw

References

1987 in Japanese sport
1987 in snooker